Wemen Solar Farm is a photovoltaic power station in northwestern Victoria, Australia. It was constructed by RCR and Laing O’Rourke for owner Wirsol Energy, completed in 2018.

References

Solar power stations in Victoria (Australia)